Mittakodur is a village and panchayat in Vikarabad  district, TS, India. It falls under Parigi mandal.

References

Villages in Ranga Reddy district